Trishul (IAST: triśūla "Trident") is a low-level quick-reaction short range surface-to-air missile developed in India by Defence Research and Development Organisation (DRDO) as part of the Integrated Guided Missile Development Programme (IGMDP). It can also be used as an anti-sea skimmer from naval ship against low flying missile, attack helicopter and aircraft.

In 2008, Minister of Defence A. K. Antony officially announced the closure of the project on a written reply to Rajya Sabha after completion of Technology Demonstration (TD) phase.

History and development
The Trishul missile project was commissioned in 1983 as a part of Integrated Guided Missile Development Programme. The primary objective was to produce short range surface to air missile with a reaction time below 6 seconds. In 1985, Trishul made its first unguided flight from Satish Dhawan Space Centre, Sriharikota. The missile made its first full range guided flight in 1989 but without television guidance (TVM) which was originally planned. Indian Army and Indian Air Force (IAF) wanted Trishul to replace the Soviet-era 9K33 Osa. On the other hand, Indian Navy wanted to purchase Barak 1 and Kashtan CIWS for point-defence role since Pakistan began acquiring Harpoon and Exocet from 1980s. By the late 1990's, DRDO pushed Trishul as an alternative to Barak 1 for Indian Navy. One of the biggest challenge faced by DRDO is to make Trishul skim just 5 meters above the sea waves at supersonic speed. 

The project was planned to be completed by 1992 and to be fitted in Brahmaputra-class frigates as an anti-sea skimmer. In 1992, the missile was successfully fired reaching Mach 2 speed following a predetermined trajectory against a target mounted 7 meter above sea but variation in altimeter led to test failure. In 1997, the associated radar systems for detecting the incoming sea-skimmer were operational at INS Dronacharya, but Indian Navy expressed its displeasure in the developmental delay of Trishul for the Brahmaputra-class frigates and finally opted for Barak 1. Trishul was unable to complete all the static trials from a fixed launcher until 1998. By May 1998, Bharat Dynamics Limited (BDL) was able to produce Trishul while the 27 tonne launch system was developed by Bharat Heavy Electricals Limited (BHEL). The first missile produced by BDL was test fired against Northrop BQM-74 Chukar in June. 

Upon reviewed by DRDO and the Indian Armed Forces in October 2001, the missile system was found deficient as the tracking radar beam was getting intermittent breaks resulting in the missile missing the target and the heavy BMP-2 chassis did not meet the General Staff Qualitative Requirements (GSQRs) for swift mobility due to heavy weight. On 25 January 2002, the naval variant of Trishul was test fired from INS Dronacharya but failed at sea-skimming capability. 

In 2003, Government of India announced that the missile will be a technology demonstrator and de-linked it from Integrated Guided Missile Development Programme. But Ministry of Defence (MoD) was not interested in downgrading the Trishul Missile project. After modification in guidance, sub-systems and propellant composition, four missiles in full combat configuration was launched from BMP-2 from June 22 to June 25, 2003. The test achieved miss distance against moving targets above the specified requirement of the Indian Armed Forces. All the sub-systems, air frames, controls, integrated with ground control system of the combat vehicle worked well. By this time Trishul became more of a research and development oriented project instead of a user driven one backed by the armed forces. Trishul was successfully test fired from Integrated Test Range (ITR) on 10 February, 26 March and 27 March of 2004. On 5 October 2005, Trishul fired towards the sea from ITR was able to hit a pilot-less target aircraft.  

Until October 2006, 80 flight tests were already completed and DRDO was in dialogue with the IAF for user trials and induction. In 2006, Minister of Defence Pranab Mukherjee granted one year extension to Trishul project. Due to project delays, and modification of GSQRs and operational requirements over time, Trishul no longer able to meet the need of the end users. For continuation of the project and funding, it was proposed that the missile will be deployed in certain locations to conduct training, fire control, and air defence practice. As per Ministry of Defence (MoD), Trishul Project met the performance parameters set by the original GSQRs but failed to achieve the perfect three-beam guidance and development of millimeter-wave active radar homing seeker. The team of 200 scientists working on Trishul were reassigned for Barak 8, a joint project between DRDO and Israel Aerospace Industries (IAI). IAF finally selected SPYDER as an alternative to Trishul. To fulfill IAF requirement, DRDO made another attempt with MBDA on a joint project called Maitri. But it got cancelled due to lack of interest. All the proven technologies and learning from Trishul later helped DRDO in QRSAM and VL-SRSAM. People who worked on Trishul and Barak 8 termed the basic design flaw as one of the many reasons behind the project failure.

Characteristics
DRDO also made an enhanced  range variant for the Indian Air Force. It is powered by a Dual-thrust propulsion stage using high-energy solid propellant. Trishul weighs  and is capable of carrying a  warhead. Trishul is 3 m in length and 20 cm in diameter. The modified naval variant use command to line-of-sight guidance mechanism. The missile can be employed against sea skimmers with a fire control radar. Trishul flies at supersonic speed. It has a low altitude radio altimeter and height lock loop control.

See also

Maitri (missile)
QRSAM
VL-SRSAM
 HISAR (surface to air missile system)
 Raad (air defense system)
 Sayyad-4
 Mersad
 Bavar-373
 Khordad 15 (air defense system)

References

External links
Technical:
 DRDO Technology Focus : Warhead for Missiles, Torpedoes and Rockets

Surface-to-air missiles of India